In Greek mythology, Solymus or Solymos (Ancient Greek: Σολύμου) may refer to two individuals:

 Solymus, an ancestral hero and eponym of the Solymi, who inhabited Milyas (i.e the area around Solyma), in south-west Anatolia. He was a son of either Ares and Caldene, daughter of Pisidus, or of Zeus and Chaldene, Calchedonia or Chalcea "the nymph". Solymus was said to have married his own sister Milye, also a local eponymous heroine. Milye's second husband was named Cragus. It is unclear whether the name Solymus is derived from a mountain by the same name (now known as Güllük Dağ) in Anatolia, or vice versa.
 Solymus, mentioned by Ovid as a Phrygian companion of Aeneas and eponym of Sulmona.

Notes

References 

 Pseudo-Clement, Recognitions from Ante-Nicene Library Volume 8, translated by Smith, Rev. Thomas. T. & T. Clark, Edinburgh. 1867. Online version at theio.com
Publius Ovidius Naso, Fasti translated by James G. Frazer. Online version at the Topos Text Project.
 Publius Ovidius Naso, Fasti. Sir James George Frazer. London; Cambridge, MA. William Heinemann Ltd.; Harvard University Press. 1933. Latin text available at the Perseus Digital Library.
 Stephanus of Byzantium, Stephani Byzantii Ethnicorum quae supersunt, edited by August Meineike (1790-1870), published 1849. A few entries from this important ancient handbook of place names have been translated by Brady Kiesling. Online version at the Topos Text Project.

Further reading
Realencyclopädie der Classischen Altertumswissenschaft, Band XV, Halbband 30, Met-Molaris lapis (1932), s. 1710; Band IIIA, Halbband 5, Silacenis-Sparsus (1927), s. 990 (German)

Children of Ares
Children of Zeus
Demigods in classical mythology
Lycians
Greek mythology of Anatolia
Lycia